In property law, a mesne assignment is an intermediate assignment in a series of assignments which occurs prior to the final assignment.

Property law